Route 899 is an east-west regional highway in the Upper Galilee in northern Israel.  For almost its entire length of 63 km it proceeds parallel to the nearby border between Israel and Lebanon.  In Israel, Route 899 is commonly known as the "highway of the north" (Hebrew: כביש הצפון, Kevish HaTzafon).

History
The road was paved in 1937 as part of the efforts to suppress the Arab revolt. After the road was paved, a fence was placed alongside the road called the "northern fence" or "Tegart's wall" which was completed in July 1938.  This fence continued south from the area of Metzudat Koach toward Lake Kinneret. On the side of the road were placed Tegart fortresses, which are now located in Ya'ara, Shomra, Sasa, Avivim and Metzudat Koach.  Sixteen pillboxes were built alongside the road between the fortresses.  Under the control of the British Mandate in Palestine access to the road was not open, and it required special permission.  The road began alongside the village Basa, what is now Betzet and the city Shlomi, and ended at the point next to Metzudat Koach, while it passed near the large Arab settlements.  The road was paved several kilometers away from the border with Lebanon.  The northern fence was taken down in 1942, but the fortresses and pillboxes remained along the length of the road.

The road today
The present-day path of the road is mostly parallel to the path of the old road of the British Mandate, but it differs in a number of locations.  The road underwent many renovations and improvements.  In a number of locations on the road there are signs pointing to the "old northern road", to sections of a few kilometers that pass just north of the present-day road, and return to merge into the same road.  The national transportation authority sometimes prepares new sections that pass along the backsides of the northern settlements, thus making the road more distant from the border between Israel and Lebanon, and enabling access to the communities from the south, away from the border and toward the majority of Israel's area.

The "northern route" is numbered 899 in the national highway numbering system.  It begins in the west at Betzet junction, next to the Mediterranean shore between Rosh HaNikra and Akhziv, where it meets Highway 4.  The road climbs via Shefa Valley and turns south to Even Menachem and Netu'a.  It meets Highway 89 at Hiram junction near Sasa, and afterward follows the path of Nahal Dishon.  After Malkia the road descends into Kadesh Valley and splits away from the international border with Lebanon.  After Metzudat Koach the road slopes precipitously downward toward the Hula Valley and ends at Ko'ah junction, where it meets Highway 90.

Junctions and interchanges on the route

See also
 List of highways in Israel

899